Pusiola ampla is a moth in the subfamily Arctiinae. It was described by Hubert Robert Debauche in 1942. It is found in the Democratic Republic of the Congo.

References

Moths described in 1942
Lithosiini
Moths of Africa
Endemic fauna of the Democratic Republic of the Congo